Xuying Road is a station on Line 17 of the Shanghai Metro. This station opened with the rest of Line 17 on 30 December 2017.

History
The station opened for passenger trial operation on 30 December 2017, concurrent with the opening of the rest of Line 17.

Description
Like all stations on Line 17, the station is fully accessible, with three elevators. Two elevators connect the street level to the concourse level at Exits 4 and 5, on the south and north side of Songze Avenue respectively. A third elevator connects the concourse to the platform within the fare-paid zone.

Exits
There are currently three exits of the station in operation:
 Exit 1: Songze Avenue south side, Xuying Road west side
 Exit 4: Songze Avenue south side
 Exit 5: Songze Avenue north side, via footbridge

Metro infrastructure in the vicinity
To the east, the tracks descend from an elevated section above the street to an underground section just before .

References

Line 17, Shanghai Metro
railway stations in China opened in 2017
railway stations in Shanghai
Shanghai Metro stations in Qingpu District